Petlas is a Turkish tyre manufacturing company, founded in 1976.

Its main markets are agricultural, commercial, and military tyres. Military market was its initial market focus in the first two decades of operation.

However, since the mid-2000s, the company is also producing a wide range of tyres for passenger cars.
Since the early 2010s, the company also produces HT, AT and MT class tyres for all-terrain 4WD vehicles. The company runs a small coal-fired power station.

External links 
 Petlas company web site
 Официальный сайт шин Petlas в Украине

References 

Tire manufacturers of Turkey
Coal in Turkey